Theodore Nikolai Lukits (November 26, 1897 – January 20, 1992) was a Romanian American portrait and landscape painter. His initial fame came from his portraits of glamorous actresses of the silent film era, but since his death, his Asian-inspired works, figures drawn from Hispanic California and pastel landscapes have received greater attention.

Lukits began his professional career as an illustrator while still in his teens. He was a still life painter, muralist and founder of the Lukits Academy of Fine Arts in Los Angeles for more than sixty years.  He had the reputation of a craftsman who made his own paints from raw pigments, constructed brushes and palettes, and designed and carved frames.  Lukits was responsible for keeping the "Beaux-Arts" methods of the French academic system alive in the western United States, and several of his students went on to prominent careers.  His works are displayed in many public collections. He was a member of a number of professional art organizations and won many awards in competitions.  Lukits has been the subject of a number of solo museum exhibitions since his death, and his work has been included in a number of other museum exhibitions devoted to Tonalism and California and American Impressionism.

Early history

Lukits was born Nicolae Teodorescu in Timișoara, Transylvania, which was then part of the Austro-Hungarian Empire. His father, Theodore Lukits, Sr., was a butcher, and his mother was a homemaker. He came to the United States at age two when his family immigrated in 1899, and he grew up in St. Louis, Missouri.  Lukits began formal studies at the St. Louis School of Fine Arts (now the Sam Fox School of Design & Visual Arts) at Washington University in St. Louis before he was twelve. His first teacher was Edmund H. Wuerpel (1866–1958). He also studied with Richard E. Miller (1875–1943) in St. Louis, who had returned home from the art colony of Givery and was staying with his parents.  Lukits left public school after the 8th grade in order to pursue a career in art, with the full cooperation of his parents.  He worked from an early age, first as an office boy and then as an airbrush artist, painting delicate girls' heads on leather.

Education in Chicago

Lukits moved to Chicago when he was fifteen to attend the Chicago Academy of Fine Arts and the Art Institute of Chicago. At the Chicago Academy he studied with the painter, illustrator and traveler Carl Werntz (1874–1944) who founded the school in 1902. He also studied with William Victor Higgins, who later became famous as one of the Taos Ten of the Taos art colony.

Lukits began at the Art Institute of Chicago with evening, weekend and summer classes because he was unable to enroll as a full-time student until he turned eighteen. Lukits studied with a number of instructors at the institute, but his main teachers and mentors were the American Impressionist Karl Albert Buehr (1866–1952), the society portrait painter Wellington J. Reynolds (1866–1949) and the figurative painter Harry Mills Walcott 1877–1930).  Lukits worked under Edwin Blashfield (1848–1936) at some point in his Chicago years, presumably as an assistant on a mural project in the Midwest, but it is not known when.  He also studied with the realist painters Robert Henri (1865–1929), Charles Webster Hawthorne (1872–1930), and George Bellows (1882–1925), who were guest instructors at the Art Institute during Lukits' tenure.

Another painter Lukits was influenced by was Housep Pushman (1877–1966). He first met the Armenian artist in 1916 in Chicago, where he had an exhibition at the Art Institute of his figurative works and Asian-themed still lifes.

During his student days, Lukits shared a studio with the Swedish-born painter Christian von Schneidau (1893–1976). The two became friends in Chicago and would later renew their friendship in California where they both would paint portraits of movie stars.

He won every major award at the Art Institute, including the Bryan Lathrop Traveling Scholarship. He paid for his studies by painting illustrations for major publications such as Cosmopolitan and The Saturday Evening Post.  After his graduation in 1918, he returned for post-graduate work the following year under Karl Buehr.  His last period of artistic study was a special scholarship which enabled him to study and travel with the Czech master of Art Nouveau, painter and Illustrator Alphonse Mucha (1860–1939) who was exhibiting his Slav Epic murals in the United States.

Lukits also attended Barnes Medical College to study human anatomy.

Professional career

After he arrived in California he rapidly became known for his portraits of early Hollywood figures Theda Bara, Pola Negri, Mae Murray and Alla Nazimova. The portrait Lukits painted of the Mexican actor Dolores del Río was exhibited at the premiere of one of her films and reproduced in newspapers in Los Angeles and Mexico City.

Lukits opened the Lukits Academy in early 1924 and continued teaching until his retirement at age ninety.  He was a well known plein-air painter, choosing the pastel medium for more than one thousand sketches he did on location in the Sierra Nevada, Death Valley, the Mojave Desert, along the California coast and at the Grand Canyon. In the early 1930s Lukits also did a series of paintings of vaqueros and female dancers that are now known as the Fiesta Suite, as studies for a mural project for Howard Hughes that was never completed.  This series of pastel and oil studies depicted many of the horsemen and young Latino actresses who came to Los Angeles to work as riders, stuntmen and extras in Hollywood films.

Lukits has been the subject of retrospective exhibitions at the Pacific Asia Museum in Pasadena, California; the Carnegie Art Museum in Oxnard, California; the Muckenthaller Cultural Center in Fullerton, California; and Mission San Juan Capistrano.

In addition to art students, Lukits taught Hollywood makeup artists.  The prominent makeup artist Louis Hippe (1909–1967) advocated the study of drawing and anatomy under Lukits in order to understand the planes and facial structure of the human head and how it would appear under artificial light, and a number of other makeup artists followed him to Lukit's atelier in the 1930s and 1940s.

Exhibitions

From the mid-1920s through the early 1930s, Lukits had a number of solo exhibitions in southern California.  The fall of 1926 may have been his most successful season.  He had an exhibition at the Southby Salon on Larchmont Boulevard that opened on September 23.  The review in the Los Angeles Times stated, "About 100 people attended.  The event of the evening was the first showing of the artist's striking portrait of Ethel Wade."

In November he had a showing in the salon of the Hollywood restaurant the Montmatre Cafe. His work included portraits, landscapes and marines. Along with Count Tolstoy and the actress Dolores Del Rio, he was the guest at a pair of receptions.

Lukits exhibited at a number of the premier Los Angeles galleries during the 1930s.  In February 1931, he had an exhibition at the Desert Gallery in Palm Springs.  In June he had a large exhibition of landscapes, still lifes and portraits at the Stendahl Galleries.  In 1935 he had a solo exhibition at the Barbara Hotel in Santa Barbara.  In 1937 he was invited to participate in a special exhibition at Harriet Day's Desert Inn Gallery in Palm Springs, Twenty Paintings by Twenty Artists, which included the work of Maurice Braun, Hanson Puthuff and Maynard Dixon. That same year Harry Muir Kurtzworth curated an exhibition at the Los Angeles Public Library titled Tonal Impressionism, with the works of Frank Tenney Johnson, Jack Wilkinson Smith, Alson Clark and Lukits.

Marriages
Lukits met the aspiring artist and actress Eleanor Merriam (1909–1948) in 1931 when she came to study with him.  She became one of his' favorite models. He painted a well-exhibited pastel portrait of her in 1932, a prize-winning artistic oil portrait titled Gesture in 1934, and another portrait in 1936. In 1937, the couple eloped to Santa Barbara and were married. In 1940, they purchased a comfortable Spanish-style home on Citrus Avenue, just south of Wilshire Boulevard, adjacent to the Hancock Park neighborhood of Los Angeles.

Working together, Eleanor Merriam Lukits' work showed her husband's influence. He often worked on her pastels and paintings, and his bolder, more confident, stroke can be discerned, according to his biographer.  Eleanor Lukits was outgoing, and drew her husband into the social whirl of Los Angeles, where she cultivated patrons and portrait sitters. The couple showed their work together extensively and she participated in many of the exhibitions for women artists of the Southland in the 1930s and 1940s.  In 1948, as she and her husband were transferring gasoline from one container to another in their basement, the vapors were ignited by a pilot light. Both Eleanor and Theodore were burned, but her internal injuries led to her death in the hospital.

Several years later, Lukits began dating Lucille Greathouse, a Disney animator and also one of his students. They were married in 1952 after a short courtship.  Lukits and his second wife lived a quieter social life, but they exhibited and were active with a number of Southern California's art organizations in the 1950s and early 1960s.  From 1952 to 1990, Lucile Lukits helped her husband run his school and business affairs, and her assistance helped put the school on firmer financial footing. After her husband's death, Lucile Lukits took over management of her husband's artwork and estate before passing the responsibility on to his students. In 1997, feeling the effects of Parkinson's disease, she moved to Utah to be closer to her family.  She died in Utah in 2003 at the age of ninety-four.  There were no children from either of Lukits' marriages.

Late career
The last generation of students that Theodore Lukits taught in the 1970s and 1980s included a number of notable figures. The plein air pastelist Arny Karl (1940–2000) studied with Lukits from 1968 to 1978. The plein air and figurative artist Peter Seitz Adams (b. 1950) apprenticed with Lukits for seven years from 1970 to 1977; and the western and plein air landscape artist Tim Solliday (b. 1952) apprenticed with Lukits for five years.  Karl, Adams, and Solliday went on to work extensively in the pastel medium.

In 1990, Lucile and Theodore Lukits, who was then in declining health, donated a large collection of his work to the Jonathan Art Foundation in Los Angeles.  This collection, which includes a large selection of his pastels as well as a number of portraits, has been loaned out to museums for exhibitions that have been mounted after his death.

Posthumous exhibitions

Since his death in 1992, Theodore Lukits' work has been the subject of solo exhibitions in California museums.  His work has also been part of many other museum exhibitions devoted to California Plein-Air Painting and figurative art.  In 1998, a traveling show was organized under the auspices of the California Art Club, titled Theodore N. Lukits: An American Orientalist. The exhibition focused on Lukits' Asian-inspired work, and included stylized portraits, plein-air landscape pastels with Japanese art influences, and a few still lifes of Asian antiques. This exhibition opened at the Pacific Asia Museum in Pasadena, California, then traveled to the Carnegie Art Museum in Oxnard and culminated at the Muckenthaler Cultural Center in Fullerton, where it was combined with some of Lukits' Hispanic-themed works for a new exhibition title, Theodore N. Lukits: From Mandarins to Mariachis. These exhibitions included many of his high-key, brightly-colored works.

Lukits made many studies and portraits of Mexican and Mexican-American sitters, some of which were preparatory works for mural projects.  These works were the subject of two different exhibitions at Mission San Juan Capistrano, in 1998 and 1999.  The second exhibition, titled Theodore N. Lukits: The Spirit of Old California, was centered on what has been called his Fiesta Suite, a collection of paintings that was used for studies for a mural of an old California fiesta scene created for Howard Hughes. It included more than a dozen figurative works, a collection of pastels, and some works that were created en plein air on the grounds of the missions in the 1920s.

One of his students, Kalan Brunink, followed his lead and became principal artist of the famed Old Town Olvera Street, Los Angeles and has a notable collection of Spanish-Mexican-American paintings and Mission San Juan Capistrano works.

The Southern Alleghenies Museum of Art has a notable collection of plein-air pastels by Theodore Lukits.  These have been central to two exhibitions at SAMA, one in 1999, devoted to landscape pastels, and the other in 2008, which featured watercolors and pastels.

Mission San Juan Capistrano was the site of another Lukits exhibition in 2001 titled Romance of the Mission, which was held in the courtyard of the mission in conjunction with the annual benefit dinner.

Partial exhibition record
 1926 – Solo Exhibition, Theodore Lukits, The Southby Art Salon, Hollywood, California, opened September 23, 1926
 1926 – Solo Exhibition, Exhibition of Portraits and Paintings by Theodore Lukits, Cafe Montmatre Salon, Hollywood, California November 4, 1926 (23 works including portraits and landscapes)
 1926 – Solo Exhibition, Annual Winter Exhibition, Portraits and Paintings by Theodore Lukits, Cafe Montmatre Salon, Hollywood, California November 25, 1926 (39 works including portraits and landscapes)
 1928 – Solo Exhibition, Edgewater Beach Club, Santa Monica, California, September, 1928 (22 works including portraits, landscapes and a maritime work)
 1930 – Group Exhibition, Ebell Salon, Los Angeles, California, March, 1930
 1930 – Solo Exhibition, Ainslie Galleries, Los Angeles, California, November 1–30, 1930 16 (16 works including figurative works and landscapes)
 1931 – Solo Exhibition, Desert Paintings by Theodore Lukits, Desert Art Gallery, Palm Springs, California, February 1–28, 1931
 1931 – Solo Exhibition, Stendahl Galleries, Ambassador Hotel, Los Angeles, California, June 1–13, 1931, (27 works including decorative portraits and landscapes)
 1935 - Solo Exhibition, Barbara Hotel, Santa Barbara, California, Circa 1935 (exhibition featuring Sierra Moonlight and Laughing Mood, hosted by John Yuke)
 1935 – Group Exhibition, Biltmore Salon, Hotel Biltmore, Los Angeles, California
 1937 – Group Exhibition, International Aeronautical Art Exhibition, Los Angeles Museum, Los Angeles, California, February 5–19, 1937 (won E.K. Hill Trophy for Best of Show for Portrait of Thea Rasche)
 1937 – Group Exhibition, Mission Inn Riverside, California, February 20–21, 1937 (works by Lukits, Schuster, Askenazy, Yens, Foster, Warner, etc.)
 1937 – Group Exhibition, California Art Club Exhibition, Municipal Art Commission Galleries, February, 1937 (exhibited Shadow of the Cross, Capistrano, and a landscape)
 1937 – Group Exhibition, Fourth Annual Exhibit of Paintings, Clearwater Junior High School, Clearwater, California, March 8–21, 1937 (Lukits exhibited Old Ironisides, with Wendt, Gleason, Braun)
 1937 – Group Exhibition, Paul Francesco Lupo Studios, Hollywood, 1937 (exhibited portraits along with Geza Kende, John Hubbard Rich, Hernando Villa)
 1937 – Group Exhibition, Ebell Salon, Eighth Competitive Exhibition of California Artists, Los Angeles, California, May, 1937 (portrait of Eleanor Merriam titled Gesture)
 1937 – Group Exhibition, Exhibition of Twenty Paintings by Twenty California Painters, Desert Inn Gallery, Palm Springs, California, April 1937 (Lukits' work Reminiscence, exhibited with Dixon, Puthuff, Braun, Pelton)
 1937 – Group Exhibition, Tonal Impressionism, Los Angeles Art Association Gallery, Los Angeles Public Library, June, 1937 (show with Lukits, Frank Tenney Johnson, Alson Clark)
 1937 – Group Exhibition, Women's City Club of Long Beach (small group show with Jack Smith, Frank Tenney Johnson, Edgar Payne; Lukits exhibited Gesture, Gordon Smith portrait)
 1937 – Group Exhibition, Friday Morning Club, October, 1937 (Lukits lectured with Willy Pogany and Frank Tenney Johnson on the topic of Old Master Painting)
 1937 – Solo Exhibition, Lukits Studio, Los Angeles, California, November 4, 1937 (exhibition and unveiling of Laura June Williams portrait)
 1937 – Group Exhibition, October Ebell Salon Exhibition, October, 1937 (Lukits exhibited with Kosa Jr., Schuster, Warner, Borg, Tenney Johnson, Parshall)
 1938 – Group Exhibition, 11th Annual Purchase Prize Exhibition, Gardena High School, April 19 – May 4, 1938 (Lukits exhibited Spring Symphony with Fechin, Dixon, Wendt Payne)
 1938 – Solo Exhibition, Ken-Mar Salon, Hollywood, California, April 25, 1938 (exhibition of Lukits portraits in conjunction with musical event)
 1938 – Group Exhibition, Ebell Salon of Art, Ninth Competitive Exhibition of California Artists, Los Angeles, May 1938 (exhibited Kurtzworth portrait with Payne, Wendt, etc.)
 1938 – Solo Exhibition, Theodore Lukits, Women's Club of Hollywood, Hollywood, California, April 24- May 1, 1938 (unveiled Kurtzworth portrait and showed 25 other works)
 1939 – Group Exhibition, Portraits, Ebell Salon of Art, Ebell Club, Los Angeles, California, March, 1939 (exhibited portrait with Von Schneidau, Foster, Bensco, Rich, Foster)
 1939 – Group Exhibition, 21st Annual Exhibition, Laguna Beach Art Association, August 8–9, 1939 (Lukits exhibited with Smith, Puthuff, Harris, Procter, Brandt, Warner)
 1942 – Group Exhibition, Annual Exhibition, Painters and Sculptors Club of Los Angeles, Los Angeles, California (won First Prize for Gesture)
 1950 – Group Exhibition, Tri-Club Exhibition, Painters and Sculptors Club, Women Painters of the West, Artists of the Southwest, Greek Theatre, (Lukits judged and exhibited Mother and Daughter portrait)
 1952 – Group Exhibition, Tri-Club Exhibition, Painters and Sculptors Club, Women Painters of the West, Artists of the Southwest, Greek Theatre, (Lukits was H.C., exhibited untitled portrait)
 1953 – Group Exhibition, Tri-Club Exhibition, Painters and Sculptors Club, S.F.V. Professional Artists Guild, Artists of the Southwest, Greek Theatre, (Lukits exhibited Spirit of the Missions with A.S.)
 1953 – Group Exhibition, San Fernando Professional Artists Guild, May 1–31, 1953, Sherman Oaks Galleries, Los Angeles, California
 1962 – Group Exhibition, Tri-Club Exhibition, Painters and Sculptors Club, Women Painters of the West, Artists of the Southwest, Greek Theatre, (Lukits judged, was H.C., exhibited demonstration sketch)
 1991 – Solo Exhibition, Pastels of Theodore Lukits, Carnegie Art Museum, Oxnard, California, March 15 – May 6, 1991 (extensive collection of works from the Jonathan Art Foundation Collection, also students)

Posthumous exhibition record

 1994 – Group Exhibition – The California Art Club: 85 Years, Carnegie Museum, Oxnard, California (the Jonathan Foundation's Marine, Late Afternoon was exhibited as one of the historic works)
 1995 – Solo Exhibition – Pastels of Theodore Lukits, Los Angeles Fine Arts Building, Los Angeles, January 12 – March 31, 1995 (pastels and Grand Canyon works)
 1996 – Solo Exhibition – Moods of Nature: Paintings by Theodore Lukits, February 5 – March 28, 1996, Santuario de Guadalupe, Santa Fe, New Mexico (large exhibition of estate pastels and Jonathan works)
 1997 – Group Exhibition  – East Coast Ideals ~ West Coast Concepts: The Living Legacy of the Boston School and the California Impressionists, Carnegie Museum; Oxnard, California, March 8 – May 18, 1997
 1997 – Group Exhibition  – East Coast Ideals ~ West Coast Concepts: The Living Legacy of the Boston School and the California Impressionists, Academy of Art College; San Francisco, California June 2–29, 1997
 1997 – Group Exhibition  – East Coast Ideals ~ West Coast Concepts: The Living Legacy of the Boston School and the California Impressionists, Springville Museum of Art; Springville, Utah, August 1 – September 28, 1997
 1998 – Group Exhibition – 89th Annual California Art Club Gold Medal Exhibition, works by historic artists of the California Art Club (Lukits' Portrait of Eleanor Merriam along with works by Bongart, Cooper, Parker)
 1998 – Group Exhibition – California Plein-Air Painting: Selections from the Johnathan Art Foundation and the Jonathan Club Collection, Gallery at 777, June 23, 1998 – September 11, 1998 (works by Manheim, Lukits, Adams, Reiffel)
 1998 – Group Exhibition – Treasures of the Sierra Nevada, Natural History Museum of Los Angeles County; Los Angeles, California, May 28 – August 30, 1998 (two High Sierra pastels exhibited, one reproduced in catalog)
 1998 – Group Exhibition – Treasures of the Sierra Nevada, Muckenthaler Cultural Center, Fullerton, California, September 12 – October 30, 1998 (two High Sierra pastels exhibited, one reproduced in catalog)
 1998 – Solo Exhibition – Theodore Lukits: An American Orientalist, The Pacific Asia Museum, Pasadena, California, October 17 – November 29, 1998 (series of Asian works on exhibit, lecture by Jeffrey Morseburg)
 1998 – Solo Exhibition– Theodore Lukits: An American Orientalist, The Carnegie Museum, Oxnard, California, December 12, 1998 – February 21, 1999 (series of Asian works on exhibit, lecture by Jeffrey Morseburg)
 1999 – Group Exhibition – Contemporary Romanticism: Landscapes in Pastel, Southern Alleghenies Museum of Art, Loretto, Pennsylvania, April 4 – May 30, 1999; (exhibited Sierra Moraine and featured in catalog)
 1999 - Solo Exhibition – Mandarins to Mariachis: An Exhibition of Paintings by Theodore Lukits, May 7–31, 1999 Muckenthaler Cultural Center, Fullerton, California (large exhibition of Asian and California-themed works)
 1999 – Solo Exhibition – Theodore Lukits & The Spirit of Old California, November 18, 1999 – January 13, 2000, Mission San Juan Capistrano Museum (including California themed works and plein-air pastels)
 2000 – Group Exhibition – 90th Annual California Art Club Gold Medal Exhibition – Paintings by Historic Artists of the CAC, June 4 – July 30, 2000. Pasadena Museum of History, Pasadena, California (Idle Hour exhibited)
 2000 – Group Exhibition – California Art Past and Present: Sponsored and Curated by the California Art Club and the Johnathan Art Foundation, October 6–8, 2000, Pasadena Women's City Club, Pasadena, California
 2001 – Group Exhibition – 91st Annual California Art Club Gold Medal Exhibition - From the Desert to the Sea: Paintings by Historic Artists and CAC Members, May 6 – July 29, 2001, Pasadena Museum of History, Pasadena, California (Capistrano Moonlight exhibited)
 2001 – Solo Exhibition – Romance of the Mission, Mission San Juan Capistrano, California, September 29, 2001 (special exhibition in courtyard of Mission San Juan Capistrano for annual benefit)
 2002 – Group Exhibition – 92nd Annual California Art Club Gold Medal Exhibition - Selection of Paintings by Historic Artists of the CAC, June 30 – August 25, 2002, Pasadena Museum of History, Pasadena, California (September Sunset exhibited)
 2008 – Group Exhibition – From Charles Burchfield to Peter Adams: Watercolors and Pastels from the Permanent Collection, Southern Alleghenies Museum of Art, March 21 – September 14, 2008, Loretto, Pennsylvania (Lukits' Sierra Moraine included)

Studio locations
 1804 S 13th Street, St. Louis, 1900s
 2620 Geyer Avenue, St. Louis, 1907–1910
 1700 12th Street, St. Louis, 1911–1912
 341 E. 42nd Street, Chicago, 1913–1914
 1513 W. Madison, Chicago, 1915
 1740 W. Adams, Chicago, 1916–1920
 1193 Leighton Avenue, Los Angeles, 1922
 1100 W. 49th Street, Los Angeles, 1920s, 1930s
 121 South Normandie, Los Angeles, 1930s
 736 South Citrus, Los Angeles, 1940–1992

Portrait commissions
 Theda Bara, c. 1920 (actress)
 Mae Murray, c. 1922 (actress)
 Alla Nazimova, c. 1922 (actress)
 Alex Maltz, c. 1922 (violinist)
 Pola Negri, c. 1922 (actress)
 The Southby Children, 1926 (dual juvenile portrait)
 Dolores Del Rio, 1926 (actress)
 Colonel Oliver Hershman, 1926 (businessman, newspaper owner)
 Mrs. Oliver Hershman, 1926
 Charles Fieldler, c. 1926 (businessman)
 Al Jolsen, c. 1928 (actor)
 Richard Keane, c. 1930 (Shakespearean actor)
 Marguerite Chapman, c. 1934 (actress; demonstration portrait)
 Thea Rasche, 1937 (aviatrix)
 Mrs. Ray ("Mal") Milland, 1942 (socialite)
 Mr. Harry G. Daniels, 1943 (businessman, H.G. Daniel's Artist's Supply)
 Mrs. Harry G. Daniels, 1943
 Mrs. William Wyler, c. 1945 (socialite)
 Alexander Finta, c. 1946 (sculptor)
 Peter Seitz Adams, c. 1974 (Artist)

Gallery representation
 J. W. Young Gallery, Chicago, Illinois (1910s, 1920s)
 Southby Salon, Hollywood, California, Los Angeles (late 1920s)
 Montmatre Cafe Salon, Hollywood, California (late 1920s)
 Kievits Gallery, Vista del Arroyo Hotel, Pasadena, California (1920s)
 Kievits Gallery, Flintridge Hotel, Flintridge, California (1920s)
 Ainsle Galleries, Los Angeles, California (1920s, 1930s)
 Isley Galleries, Ambassador Hotel, Los Angeles (1930s)
 Desert Art Gallery, Palm Springs, California (1930s)
 R.C. Vose Galleries, Boston (1929–1941)
 Stendahl Galleries, Los Angeles (1930s)
 Desert Inn Gallery, Palm Springs (1930s, 1940s)
 Doug Jones Gallery, La Jolla, California (1960s, 1970s)
 Zantmann Gallery, Carmel, California (1970s)
 Howard Morseburg Galleries, Los Angeles, California, portrait commissions (1970s)
 Jeffrey Morseburg, West Hollywood, California, estate representation
 American Legacy Fine Arts, Pasadena, California

Art club memberships

 California Art Club, Pasadena, California, Honorary Life Member, 1920s, 1930s, 1970s
 Painters and Sculptors League, Chicago, Illinois, 1910s, 1920s
 American Artists Professional League, New York, New York, 1920s
 American Federation of Fine Arts, New York, New York, 1920s, 1930s
 American International Academy, Baltimore, Maryland, 1920s, 1930s
 American-International Fine Arts Society, Boston, Massachusetts, 1930s
 Painters and Sculptors Club of Los Angeles, Los Angeles, California, 1920s, 1930s, 1940s, 1950s
 Laguna Art Association, Laguna Beach, California, 1920s
 International Artists Club, Hollywood, California, 1920s
 McDowell Club of Allied Arts, Los Angeles, California 1920as
 American Artist's League, New York, New York, 1920s, 1930s
 International Artists League, New York, New York, 1920s, 1930s
 Jonathan Club, Life Artist Member, Los Angeles, California 1931–1992
 Los Angeles Art Association, Los Angeles, California 1930s
 Riverside Art Association, Riverside, California, 1930s
 Hollywood Association of Artists, Hollywood, California, 1940s
 Santa Monica Art Association, Santa Monica, California, 1940s
 Valley Artists Guild, Los Angeles, California, 1950s
 Society for Sanity in Art, Chicago, Illinois 1930
 Artists of the Southwest, San Francisco, 1940s, 1950s
 Co-Ordinating Committee for Traditional Art, Los Angeles, California, 1940s, 1950s
 San Fernando Valley Professional Artists Guild, Los Angeles, California, 1940s, 1950s

Public collections

 Nantucket Historical Society, Nantucket, Massachusetts
 California Art Club, Pasadena, California
 The Jonathan Art Foundation, Los Angeles, California
 The Southern Alleghenies Museum, Loretto, California
 The Irvine Museum, Irvine, California

Prominent students of Theodore Lukits
 Peter Seitz Adams (b. 1950), Plein-Air Painter and figurative artist, President, California Art Club
 Kalan Brunink (1947-2009), fine artist (California Art Club), caricature (Olvera Street artist), illustrator, muralist, personal care assistant for Theodore Lukits
 Entéra, fine artist, muralist, cartoonist
 Arny Karl (1940–2000), plein-air painter
 Nancy Kominsky (b. 1915), artist, British television personality
 Albert Londraville (1922-2015), illustrator, fine artist
 Corinne Malvern (1901–1956), illustrator, art director
 Frank Ordaz, Jr., illustrator, animator, fine artist
 Tim Solliday (b. 1950), western painter, plein-air painter
 Gino Rafaelli, illustrator, art director
 Mario Rueda, teacher, illustrator
 James Verdugo, fine artist
 Idelle Weber (b. 1932), contemporary artist
 Chester Russell Williams (1921–1994), American and British artist
 Paul Kocalis (b.1951) Fine artist (California Art Club), portraiture, scenic artist, plein-air painter

See also

Peter Seitz Adams
American Impressionism
California Art Club
California Plein-Air Painting
Decorative Impressionism
Early California artists
Arny Karl
Richard E. Miller
Tim Solliday
Tonal Impressionism
Tonalism
Carl Werntz

Notes

Books and exhibition catalog references
A Catalog of the Officers and Students of Washington University, Pg. 324, Washington University in St. Louis, 1911 (Lukits is listed as Theodore Lukits Jr. 2630 Geyer Avenue, St. Louis)
 Circular of Instruction of the School of Drawing, Painting, Modeling, Decorative Designing, Normal Instruction, Illustration and Architecture. Art Institute of Chicago, 1913–1914 (Lukits appears in summer school evening classes)
 Circular of Instruction of the School of Drawing, Painting, Modeling, Decorative Designing, Normal Instruction, Illustration and Architecture. Art Institute of Chicago, 1914–1915 (Lukits appears in summer school evening classes)
 Circular of Instruction of the School of Drawing, Painting, Modeling, Decorative Designing, Normal Instruction, Illustration and Architecture. Art Institute of Chicago, 1915–1916 (Lukits appears in evening school classes)
 Circular of Instruction of the School of Drawing, Painting, Modeling, Decorative Designing, Normal Instruction, Illustration and Architecture. Art Institute of Chicago, 1916–1917 (Lukits appears as full-time student)
 Circular of Instruction of the School of Drawing, Painting, Modeling, Decorative Designing, Normal Instruction, Illustration and Architecture. Art Institute of Chicago, 1917–1918 (Lukits appears as full-time student)
 Circular of Instruction of the School of Drawing, Painting, Modeling, Decorative Designing, Normal Instruction, Illustration and Architecture. Art Institute of Chicago, 1918–1919 (Lukits appears as graduate student)
 Scholarship Awards, Bulletin of the Art Institute of Chicago, 1918 (monthly bulletin – mention of Theodore Lukits winning Lathrop Traveling Scholarship for $800)
 Scholarships, Annual Report of the Trustees of the Art Institute of Chicago, Volume 41–44, Pg. 47, 1919 (mention of the Lathrop Traveling Scholarship for $800)
 Frederick Magnus Brand Memorial Prize Winner, Annual Report, The Art Institute of Chicago, 1918 (bound annual – Lukits won Magnus Brand Memorial Prize for Composition)
 Brandstatter, Eddie, Brochure for Lukits' Exhibition at the Montmatre Cafe, 1926 (exhibition brochure)
 Catalog of Copyrights, Artists, Pt. 4, Volume 21–22, Pg. 16, United States Government Printing Office, Washington D.C., 1926 (copyright listing)
 California Art and Architecture, Volume 36, 1929 (lists past Lukits exhibitions held during the year)
 Lukits Exhibit, Desert Art Gallery, Palm Springs, California Arts and Architecture, Volume 39, Page 8, February, 1931 (lists Lukits exhibition, February 1–28, 1931)
 Mallett's Index of Artists, Pg. 264, 1935 (biographical dictionary – listing)
 Reuter, Herman, Colorists, Arts Magazine, Volume 2, Page 3, 1936 (column on colorists by Reuter states "Theodore Lukits stands alone in the department of elemental richness.")
 American Art Annual, Volume 36, Issue 2, Pg. 393, American Federation of the Arts, Washington D.C., 1947 (listing)
 Who's Who in American Art, 1940–1941, Page 407 (biographical entry on Lukits)
 International Who's Who, Volume II, Pg. 531, 1947 (biographical dictionary – listing)
 White, James Ferry, National Cyclopedia of American Biography, Volume 39, Pg. 80, 1967 (biographical dictionary – listing)
 Who's Who in California, Who's Who Historical Society, Pg. 466, 1971 (biographical dictionary – listing)
 Dawdy, Doris, Ostrander, American Artists of the West, Volume 2, Pg. 173, 1974 (biographical dictionary – listing)
 Moure, Nancy, Dictionary of Artists in Southern California Before 1930, Dustin Publishing, 1977 (biographical dictionary – listing)
 McCall, Dewitt, Clinton, California Artists 1935–1956, Pg. 72, 1981 (biographical Dictionary – Listing)
 Moure, Nancy, Publications in Southern California Art, 1,2,3, Dustin Publishing, 1984 (bibliographical references on California art – listings)
 Castagno, John, American Artists' Signatures and Monograms: 1800–1989, Pg. 232, Scarecrow Press, 1990 (dictionary of monograms and signatures – examples)
 Bellah, Suzanne, The Pastels of Theodore Lukits, Carnegie Art Museum, Oxnard, California, 1991 (essays by Suzanne Bellah; recollections by Peter Adams, Tim Solliday; biographical essay by Peter Adams and Suzanne Bellah of Carnegie Museum)
 Goode, Stephen H., American Humanities Index, Volume 16, Part 2, Pg. 1871, 1991
 Official Museum Directory, American Association of Museums, Pg, 80, 1992
 Stern, Jean, Treasures of the Sierra Nevada, Exhibition Catalog, California Art Club, Pasadena, California, 1998 (Lukits' Sierra pastel reproduced in exhibition catalog)
 Morseburg, Jeffrey, Theodore Lukits, An American Orientalist, Exhibition Catalog, Pacific Asia Museum, 1998 (essays on Lukits and his Asian subjects)
 Morseburg, Jeffrey, The Spirit of Old California, November, 1999 (short essay in small color catalog)
 Young, William, Mallett's Index of Artists: International Biography, Including Painters and Sculptors, Pg. 264, 1999 (biographical dictionary – listing)
 Tomor, Michael, PhD, Contemporary Romanticism: Landscapes in Pastel,  Southern Alleghenies Museum of Art, Loretto, Pennsylvania, April 4 – May 30, 1999 (exhibition catalog with essays on Lukits and his students)
 Artists of the World, A Bio-Biographical Dictionary, Index A-Z, Pg. 384, 2000 (biographical dictionary – listing)
 Stern, Jean & Morseburg, Jeffrey, California Art Club: 90th Annual Gold Medal Exhibition, California Art Club, 2000, Exhibition Catalog, California Art Club, Pasadena, California, 2000 (biography and Idle Hour reproduced with other historic works)
 Dini, Jane & Morseburg, Jeffrey, California Art Club: 91st Annual Gold Medal Exhibition, California Art Club, 2001 (biography and Capistrano Moonlight exhibited with other historic works)
 Stavig, Vikki, The Revitalization of the California Art Club, California Art Club: 91st Annual Gold Medal Exhibition, Exhibition Catalog, California Art Club, Pasadena, California, 2001 (reproduced September Sunset)
 Hughes, Eden, Artists in California 1786–1940, Hughes Publishing, 2001 (biographical dictionary – listing)
 Havlice, Patrica Pate, Index to Artistic Biography: A Dictionary of American Painters, Sculptors and Engravers, Pg. 1157, Scarecrow Press, 2002 (biographical dictionary – listing)
 Morseburg, Jeffrey, unpublished manuscript for biography on Theodore Lukits, 2009
 Morseburg, Jeffrey, Catalog Essay Manuscript for Jonathan Art Foundation, Los Angeles, California, 2010
 Morseburg, Jeffrey, Theodorelukits.org, official Lukits website, essays and biographical information (various essays on Lukits, extensive archival sources)

Periodical references (articles and illustrations)
 "Theodore Lukits, Artist of the Month", The Republic Item, October, 1918, Chicago, Illinois
 Unsigned article, "Art as a Civic Asset", The Broadway World, November, 1926 (Illustration of the Dolores Del Rio Portrait)
 Clover, Madge, "Charming Painting by Lukits", Los Angeles Saturday Night, December 30, 1933 (weekly review, Lukits work on cover)
 Clover, Madge, "Lukits Exhibit at Barker Brothers", Los Angeles Saturday Night, January 13, 1934 (weekly review, Reproduction of Sierra Scene Quietude)
 Clover, Madge, "Tranquility by Theodore Lukits", Los Angeles Saturday Night, February 17, 1934 (weekly review, reproduction of the marine Tranquility)
 Clover, Madge, "The Bandit by Theodore Lukits", Los Angeles Saturday Night, March 17, 1934 (weekly review, Reproduction of the Californio Work, The Bandit)
 California Art News, December 11, 1934 (art and culture newspaper, article on Lukits School)
 Cover illustration, Los Angeles Saturday Night, February 6, 1937 (weekly review, Portrait of Esther Rose on cover)
 Women's Club of Hollywood News, April, 1938 (article on Lukits exhibition in April 1938)
 "Theodore Lukits: Who's Who in Jonathan Members", The Johnathan, October, 1941 (magazine of the Jonathan Club)
 "The Private Life of Ray Milland", Movies Magazine, September, 1942 (image of Lukits' portrait of Mal Milland)
 Chevalier, Paul, "Art Committee Uncovers Last Club Life Artist", The Jonathan, March, 1987 (magazine article)
 Chevalier, Paul, "Lukits Art Collection donated to Jonathan", July, 1990 (magazine article)
 Chevalier, Paul, "Lukits on Loan", The Jonathan, September, 1990 (note on loan of pastels from the Jonathan Collection)
 "Pastel Paradise", Southwest Art Magazine, April 1991  (column on Carnegie Museum exhibition)
 Gjertson, Stephen, "Theodore Lukits: A Light in the Desert", Classical Realism Journal, Volume II, Issue I (6-page magazine article)
 Los Angeles Magazine, Display Advertising, Pg. 128, April, 1998 (advertisement for Oriental Still Life from George Stern Fine Arts)
 Morseburg, Jeffrey, Theodore Lukits, Part I, California Art Club Newsletter, October, 1998
 Morseburg, Jeffrey, Theodore Lukits, Part II, California Art Club Newsletter, December, 1998
 "Mandarins to Mariachis", Orange Coast Magazine, April, 1999 (preview of exhibition at Muckenthaler Cultural Center)
 "Mandarins to Mariachis", Orange Coast Magazine, Pg. 173, May, 1999 (preview of exhibition at Muckenthaler Cultural Center)
 Morseburg, Jeffrey, "Theodore N. Lukits", Para Todos Magazine, San Juan Capistrano, California, November, 2001 (Spanish-language article on Lukits for Mission San Juan exhibition)

Miscellaneous references
 Lukits, Lucile, Lukits Academy tuition records, 1952–1990, Lukits archive
 Lukits, Lucille, Theodore Lukits: The Torchbearer, unpublished handwritten essay, c. 1992, Lukits archive

Website and online references
 Ancestry.com, online research site, Lukits family history, U.S. Department of Immigration and Naturalization, Department of State Records, Immigration, Citizenship
 Merrell, Eric, Honorary Life Members of the California Art Club, CAC website, 2007–2010
 Merrell, Eric, Historic Membership Roster of the California Art Club, CAC website, 2008–2010
 Stern, Jean, Treasures of the Sierra Nevada, exhibition catalog, 1998

Newspaper references
 Lindsay, Estelle Lawton, "Santa Barbara Quake Restores $20,000 Treasure to Padres", Los Angeles Evening Express, July 22, 1925 (front page article with Lukits and unrestored painting)
 Lindsay, Estelle Lawton, "Brush Blots out Damage Quake Caused", Los Angeles Evening Express, August 12, 1925 (front page article with Lukits and restored painting)
 New York Times, "Earthquake Restores St. Francis Portrait", September 20, 1925 (clipping on Lukits' restoration of St. Francis painting for Santa Barbara Hotel)
 Los Angeles Sunday Times, "Beauty and Elegance", September 26, 1926, pg. 31 (photograph of the Ethel Wade portrait with caption of Southby Salon)
 "Lukits Weds, Artists Bare Rites in Santa Barbara", April, 1937 (clipping existent, unmarked, probably from Los Angeles Times or Herald Examiner)
 "Theodore Lukits Reveals Nuptials", April, 1937 (clipping existent, unmarked, probably from Los Angeles Times or Herald Examiner)
 "Shower Given for Mrs. Lukits", May 1937 (clipping existent, unmarked, probably from Los Angeles Times or Herald Examiner)
 "Bride Secretly Wedded Now Shower Guest", May, 1937 (clipping existent, unmarked, probably from Los Angeles Times or Herald Examiner)
 Stevens, Otherman, "Now and Then", Los Angeles Examiner, May 31, 1932 (newspaper review)
 Long Beach Press Telegram, "Posing by Critics of Art Condemned", March 16, 1938 (lecture by Lukits at Long Beach Art Association)
 Los Angeles Times, c. March, 1938 (note that Lukits will be guest artist for the Women's Club of South Pasadena)
 Reuter, Herman, "Painter Real Colorist, Reviewer States", Hollywood Citizen News, April 9, 1938 (positive review of portrait exhibition at Hollywood Women's Club)
 "Lukits Portraits Accorded Praise", Hollywood Citizen News, Saturday, April 16, 1938 (news clipping, reproductions of Laura June Williams portrait and Portrait of the Artists' Wife)
 Lusk, Freeman, possibly Hollywood Citizen News, April, 1938 (over the top review of Lukits' portrait exhibition at Hollywood Women's Club)
 Millier, Arthur, "Brush Strokes", Los Angeles Times, April 24, 1938 (announcement of Kurtzworth portrait unveiling)
 Wilshire Press, April 25, 1938, (short review of Lukits exhibition at Hollywood Women's Club and note of painting Mrs. Harry Muir Kurtzworth and Her Daughter Constance)
 "Art, Music Mingle when Ray Millands Entertain Friends", Los Angeles Times, June 2, 1942 (article on unveiling of Lukits' portrait of Mrs. Ray ("Mal") Milland)
 "Ray Millands Honor Artist at Unveiling", Los Angeles Herald Examiner, June 2, 1942 (article on unveiling of Lukits' portrait of Mrs. Ray ("Mal") Milland)
 "Explosion in Basement Burns Artist and Wife", Los Angeles Times, September 10, 1948 (news clipping)
 "Eleanor Lukits, Dies of Explosion Burns", Los Angeles Times, September 26, 1948 (news clipping)
 "Mrs. Eleanor Lukits Funeral Services", Los Angeles Times, September 27, 1948 (news clipping)
 "School Head Addresses East Los Angeles Art Club", Los Angeles Tribune, May 7, 1953 (news clipping)
 Morseburg Jeffrey, Lukits obituary, Los Angeles Times, February 2, 1992 (news clipping)
 Woodard, Josef, "In Vivid Pastel", April 4, 1991, Los Angeles Times (review of Lukits' pastel exhibition at the Carnegie Museum in Oxnard)
 McKinnon, Lisa, "Artist's Sketches Push Pastel to Limit", Ventura Press Courier, April 4, 1991 (review of Lukits' pastel exhibition at the Carnegie Museum in Oxnard)
 Indyke, Dottie, "Nature's Moods Plus Portraits of the Stars", unknown publication, Santa Fe, New Mexico, February–March, 1996 (preview of Lukits' exhibition at Santuario de Guadalupe)
 Woodard, Josef, "Oriented East, Strong Asian influence is seen in Oxnard art exhibitions", Los Angeles Times, 1998 (review of Theodore Lukits: An American Orientalist at the Carnegie)
 Kirkman, Chuck, "Art Show Opening", Ventura County Star, December 13, 1998 (photograph of Peter Adams and Jeffrey Morseburg with Lukits painting reproduced and released by AP)
 Rice, Ruth, "Melding Two Into One, Art Exhibition Combines Pastels and Watercolors", The Tribune Democrat, Johnstown, Pennsylvania, April 8, 2008 (article on Southern Alleghenies Museum of Art exhibition, From Charles Burchfield to Peter Adams)

External links
 Official educational website devoted to Theodore Lukits
 Preview of the 1999 exhibition Mandarins to Mariachis at the Muckenthaler Cultural Center in Fullerton, California
 Real estate listing for Lukits' former Hancock Park home and studio
 Honorary Life Members of the California Art Club
 Historic membership roster of the California Art Club
 Website dedicated to the plein-air pastel painter Arny Karl, student of Theodore Lukits
 Southern Alleghenies Museum of Art, SAMA, collection of plein-air pastels includes works by Theodore Lukits and his students
 Website for Pacific Asia Museum, site of Theodore Lukits: An American Orientalist Exhibition
 Website for Mission San Juan Capistrano, site of Theodore Lukits exhibitions and some of his works
 Theodore Lukits' Fiesta Suite exhibition at Mission San Juan Capistrano, Traditional Fine Art Online website preview
 Theodore Lukits: An American Orientalist Catalog at the CAC gift shop
 Historic L.A. site with Location of Montmatre Cafe, site of Lukits exhibitions in the 1920s

American portrait painters
American landscape painters
1897 births
1992 deaths
Impressionism
Tonalism
Painters from California
Painters from Missouri
Students of Robert Henri
Romanian Austro-Hungarians
Austro-Hungarian emigrants to the United States
Artists from St. Louis
20th-century American painters
American male painters
Sam Fox School of Design & Visual Arts alumni